The Cabanis's seedeater (Amaurospiza concolor) is a species of bird in the cardinal family Cardinalidae that the International Ornithological Committee (IOC) accepted as a species in 2015. (But see the taxonomy section below.) It is found southern Mexico and Central America.

Taxonomy and systematics

In 2015 the IOC split the subspecies Amaurospiza concolor aequatorialis from the blue seedeater (Amaurospiza concolor sensu lato) as the Ecuadorean seedeater (Amaurospiza aequatorialis) and renamed A. concolor Cabanis's seedeater.  The decision was based on a molecular phylogenetic study published in 2014. However, the South American Classification Committee of the American Ornithological Society (AOS) had previously rejected the split, and as of May 2021 the AOS North American Committee has not considered it and the Clements taxonomy has not adopted it. Confusingly, BirdLife International uses the scientific name A. moesta for blue seedeater, but the IOC, AOS, and Clements assign that binomial to blackish-blue seedeater. The BirdLife account encompasses what are now Cabanis's, Ecuadorian, and blackish-blue seedeaters.

Cabanis's seedeater as defined by the IOC has two subspecies, the nominate Amaurospiza concolor concolor and A. c. relicta.

Description

The nominate male is entirely slate blue. The female's upperparts are cinnamon and the underparts tawny. The male A. c. relicta is more slaty (less blue) than the nominate and has black lores; the female is a paler cinnamon.

Distribution and habitat

The nominate Cabanis's seedeater is found from Chiapas in southern Mexico through Central America to western and central Panama. A. c. relicta is found in six southwestern Mexico states, Jalisco, Colima, Morelos, Puebla, Guerrero and Oaxaca. The species inhabits openings in and edges of humid montane and secondary forest. It most often is found at sites with bamboo.

Behavior

Feeding

Cabanis's seedeater's diet includes insects, seeds, and bamboo shoots.

Breeding

The only known Cabanis's seedeater nest was found in Mexico. It was a cup of coarse grass lined with finer grass placed in the fork of a slender branch. It contained two seedeater eggs and one of the brood parasite bronzed cowbird (Molothrus aeneus).

Vocalization

Cabanis's seedeater's songs and calls have been transcribed in several ways.

Status

The IUCN has not assessed Cabanis's seedeater.

References

External links
 Xeno-canto: audio recordings of Cabanis's seedeater

Cabanis's seedeater
Birds of Guatemala
Birds of El Salvador
Birds of Honduras
Birds of Nicaragua
Birds of Costa Rica
Birds of Panama
Cabanis's seedeater
Taxonomy articles created by Polbot
Taxobox binomials not recognized by IUCN